The Living Room EP is the debut album from the American rock band the Seldon Plan.

Content
The seven-track indie pop rock album was released on compact disc and digital download with The Beechfields Record Label, on July 31, 2003. It was recorded by Frank Marchand in June of that year, at Waterford Digital in Pasadena, Maryland, with production by Marchand and the Seldon Plan. The songs on The Living Room EP are loosely stitched together, and it contains lush sounds, and scraped, distorted guitars. It draws comparison to the music of artists on the independent record label Deep Elm Records, the indie rock band Unrest, and the alternative rock band Tsunami, and the vocals are likened to the new wave band Tears for Fears vocalist, Roland Orzabal.

A review from AllMusic says "though promising, the Seldon Plan's debut is a bit odd. The Baltimore quartet [...] seems intent on crafting a mature indie pop sound [that] continues tingeing instrumentally toward a slightly angular, emo-influenced sound."

Track listing

Personnel
Mike Landavere – drums
Bobby Landle – guitar
Dave Hirner – bass
Michael Nestor – vocals and guitar

References
Citations

Bibliography

External links

2003 debut EPs
The Seldon Plan albums